GAAGO is an Irish IPTV service from RTÉ and the Gaelic Athletic Association. It is a subscription based sports channel aimed at an international market and at the Irish diaspora around the world. It features over 100 live and on demand Gaelic games over the year, a library of award-winning GAA documentaries as well as an archive of classic games from yesteryear.

History
As part of their broadcast rights deal, the GAA announced that it was to set up a new IPTV service for an international market. The service is to be owned by RTÉ and the GAA. RTÉ will use their digital division to run the channel. In 2020 GAAGO launched a similar streaming services for Irish Soccer called Watch LOI as the service provider for the Football Association of Ireland.

Programming

GAA
 Allianz Leagues games
 GAA Championship Coverage

Ownership

The service is a commercial service jointly owned and operated by RTÉ and the GAA.

Sponsorship

GAAGO is to sponsor the 2017 International Rules Series and promoted The All Britain Championships British GAA taking place in London (July 2017). They are also a sponsor of the Asian Gaelic Games in Bangkok 17 to 19 November.

Availability

GAAGO is available worldwide on their website. It will broadcast live RTE, TG4 & games, however SKY exclusive games (14) will not be broadcast by the service within the UK. Live TV rights to championship games have been awarded to RTÉ and Sky in Ireland, Premier Sports and SKY in Britain. Rights to Allianz Leagues games have been award to TG4 in Ireland.

See also
 GAA
 RTÉ

References

External links
 

Sports mass media in Ireland
Television channels and stations established in 2014